Street Legal is a Canadian legal drama television series, which aired on CBC Television from 1987 to 1994 before returning with six new episodes starting March 4, 2019. Street Legal was the longest-running one-hour scripted drama in the history of Canadian television, holding the record for twenty years before being surpassed by Heartland's 139th episode on March 29, 2015.

Synopsis
Street Legal focuses on the professional and private lives of the partners in a small Toronto, Ontario law firm. The primary stars are Sonja Smits, Eric Peterson and C. David Johnson, and the cast also includes Julie Khaner, Albert Schultz, Cynthia Dale, Maria del Mar, Ron Lea, Anthony Sherwood and Diane Polley.

The series is distinctively Canadian, in the use of Canadian court customs and procedures. Much of the show's music was composed by Eric Robertson who was nominated for a Gemini Award in 1987 for his work on the show.

Cast and characters

In the early episodes, the show's three core characters were Carrie Barr (Smits), Leon Robinovitch (Peterson) and Chuck Tchobanian (Johnson), partners in the small downtown Toronto law firm of Barr, Robinovitch and Tchobanian. The three did not necessarily always see eye to eye on things: Tchobanian was a flashy, confident and conservative lawyer who was most interested in taking high-profile cases that would get his name into the media; Robinovitch was an activist labour lawyer who believed in defending the little guy and mounted a campaign for Mayor of Toronto during the series run; Barr was a soft-spoken and initially naïve young lawyer who was sometimes forced to mediate between her more opinionated partners. According to series producer Maryke McEwen, "if you want to label the characters I'd call them Liberal, Conservative and NDP."

Characters introduced later included Mercedes (Sealy-Smith), the firm's no-nonsense office manager; Olivia Novak (Dale), an aggressive, risk-taking new lawyer with the firm who was a foil for Carrie and a love interest for Chuck; Alana Newman (Khaner), a judge who was married to Leon; Rob Diamond (Schultz), who joined the firm as a junior lawyer; Dillon Beck (Sherwood), a crown prosecutor who married Carrie; and Laura Crosby (del Mar), a new lawyer who joined the firm after Carrie was killed by a drunk driver.

In the 2019 revival, Olivia loses her job with a Bay Street firm, and joins RDL Legal, a boutique firm with whom she was formerly competing to land a major case.

Original cast
Sonja Smits as Carrington "Carrie" Barr
C. David Johnson as Charles "Chuck" Tchobanian
Eric Peterson as Leon Robinovitch
Cynthia Dale as Olivia Novak
David James Elliott as Nick Del Gado
Julie Khaner as Alana Newman Robinovitch
Anthony Sherwood as Dillon Beck
Albert Schultz as Rob Diamond
Maria del Mar as Laura Crosby
Ron Lea as Brian Malony
Alison Sealy-Smith as Mercedes

2019 revival cast
Cynthia Dale as Olivia Novak
Cara Ricketts as Lilly Rue
Steve Lund as Adam Darling
Yvonne Chapman as Mina Lee
Joanne Vannicola as Sam
Emmanuel Kabongo as Roman Mussi

Show history

The original series pilot aired on CBC Television in 1986 as Shellgame, a television film written by William Deverell which starred Brenda Robins as a lawyer defending accused murderer André (Germain Houde). The film was not well received by audiences or critics, however, and the project was retooled and recast before premiering as a series in 1987.

The series debuted on January 6, 1987, with a six-episode run that season. Maryke McEwen was the executive producer. Early critical response to the series frequently compared it to the contemporaneous American series L.A. Law, with some reviewers even coining the dismissive epithet T.O. Law. The series then returned for a longer second season in September 1987.

From the third through the seventh seasons, Brenda Greenberg was first senior producer, then executive producer, with Nada Harcourt taking over for the final season.

The show's last regular weekly episode aired on February 18, 1994.

Production wrapped up with the two-hour television film Last Rights, which aired on November 6, 1994. Loosely based on the case of Sue Rodriguez, an assisted suicide activist who died a week before Street Legal's final regular episode aired, the film centred on Olivia's criminal trial after helping a terminally ill friend (Brent Carver) commit suicide. The film drew 1.6 million viewers.

Revival
The concept for a 2019 revival of Street Legal was first discussed during a lunch including Cynthia Dale and Sally Catto, CBC's general manager of programming. During a subsequent lunch, producer Bernie Zukerman and Catto began to plan specifics for a relaunch. The revival centres on Olivia Novak (Dale), joining a small boutique law office, RDL Legal, after losing her job with a powerful Bay Street firm. In addition to Dale reprising her original role, the cast also includes Cara Ricketts, Steve Lund and Yvonne Chapman. Eric Peterson and Anthony Sherwood made guest appearances reprising their roles as Leon Robinovitch and Dillon Beck, but were not part of the full-time cast. Actors Allan Hawco, Patrick Labbé, Leni Parker, Rosemary Dunsmore and Tom McCamus also appeared in supporting roles.

The new season of six episodes premiered on March 4, 2019, on CBC Television. After each episode was broadcast, it also became available for viewing on the CBC Gem streaming service. The primary theme of the six episodes is the opioid crisis in Canada, including a class action lawsuit against a major pharmaceutical company that manufactures a highly addictive drug.

In April 2019, the CBC announced that the reboot would not be renewed for a second season. The ninth season premiered on June 21, 2021, on Ovation in the United States and was also be released on the Ovation NOW app streaming service in the "Mystery Alley" channel section early before its premiere.

Episodes

Season 1 (1987)

Season 2 (1987)

Season 3 (1988–89)

Season 4 (1989–90)

Season 5 (1990–91)

Season 6 (1991–92)

Season 7 (1992–93)

Season 8 (1993–94)

Season 9 (2019)

Production
The creators of the 2019 series are Bruce M. Smith and Bernie Zukerman. The series is co-produced by IGP Productions and Broken Clown Company. The executive producers are Zukerman and Smith while the producers are listed as Cynthia Dale and Rayne Zukerman. Filming of the six episodes was completed primarily in Montreal with some work done in Toronto.

References

External links

1987 Canadian television series debuts
1994 Canadian television series endings
Canadian legal television series
Canadian television soap operas
Canadian television series revived after cancellation
CBC Television original programming
Television shows set in Toronto
Television shows filmed in Montreal
Television shows filmed in Toronto
1980s Canadian drama television series
1990s Canadian drama television series
2010s Canadian drama television series
2019 Canadian television series debuts
2019 Canadian television series endings